Veikko Heinonen (4 October 1934 – 4 November 2015) was a Finnish former ski jumper who competed in the 1950s, winning a silver medal at the 1954 FIS Nordic World Ski Championships on the large hill in Falun.

He was born in Lahti in 1934, and died in 2015.

References

External links

1934 births
2015 deaths
Sportspeople from Lahti
Finnish male ski jumpers
FIS Nordic World Ski Championships medalists in ski jumping
20th-century Finnish people